Dženan Pejčinović (born 15 February 2005) is a German professional footballer who plays as a forward for Bundesliga club VfL Wolfsburg.

Club career
Born in Munich to Bosniak parents from Plav, Pejčinović got into football from a young age as his father, Dževad, was also a footballer. He started his career with German giants Bayern Munich through their youth system, before a move to FC Augsburg in 2017. After stellar performances in the FC Augsburg academy, he was linked with moves to teams across Europe, including Italian sides Inter Milan, AC Milan and Juventus, English sides Chelsea and Manchester City, and Dutch side Ajax.

Despite this interest, Pejčinović decided to stay in Germany, signing for VfL Wolfsburg in July 2022.

International career
Having represented Montenegro at under-15 level, Pejčinović switched allegiances to Germany in 2020, and has represented them from under-16 to under-18 level.

Style of play
A tall and powerful forward, he has earned comparisons to Bosnian striker Edin Džeko, and was given the nickname "Džeko" by his teammates at Wolfsburg. Pejčinović himself says his strengths are heading the ball and his finishing ability. He is a fan of English forward Harry Kane.

References

External links
 Profile at the VfL Wolfsburg website
 

2005 births
Living people
Footballers from Munich
German people of Montenegrin descent
German footballers
Germany youth international footballers
Montenegrin footballers
Montenegro youth international footballers
Association football forwards
FC Bayern Munich footballers
FC Augsburg players
VfL Wolfsburg players